Mona Airport is an airstrip on Mona Island, the third largest island of Puerto Rico. Private and commercial flights require a permit for use of the landing strip. The permit can only be acquired through the Puerto Rico Department of Natural and Environmental Resources. The airport is also available to planes for emergency purposes.

Mona Island is a natural reserve and there are no permanent inhabitants. Rangers from the Department of Natural and Environmental Resources rotate residence on the island to manage visitors and take part in research projects.

The runway parallels the island's southwest shore. Approach and departures are over the water. An overrun to the northwest will hit some coral rock outcroppings.

See also
Transport in Puerto Rico
List of airports in Puerto Rico

References

External links
OpenStreetMap - Mona Airport

Airports in Puerto Rico
Mayagüez, Puerto Rico